State Road 451 (NM 451) is a  state highway in the US state of New Mexico. NM 451's northern terminus is at U.S. Route 84 (US 84) north of Dilia, and the southern terminus is at NM 119 east of Anton Chico.

Major intersections

See also

References

451
Transportation in Guadalupe County, New Mexico
Transportation in San Miguel County, New Mexico